Banksia meganotia is a species of prickly shrub that is endemic to Western Australia. It has linear, pinnatiparite leaves with sharply-pointed lobes, yellow flowers in heads of about forty and relatively small follicles.

Description

Taxonomy and naming
This species was first formally described in 1996 by Alex George in the journal Nuytsia from specimens he collected in the Dongolocking Nature Reserve, and was given the name Dryandra meganotia. In 2007, Austin Mast and Kevin Thiele transferred all the dryandras to the genus Banksia and this species became Banksia meganotia. The specific epithet (meganotia) is from ancient Greek words meaning "large" and "southern" referring to the Great Southern region of Western Australia, where this species occurs.

Distribution and habitat
Banksia meganotia mainly grows in kwongan between Kulin and Nyabing in the Avon Wheatbelt and Mallee biogeographic regions.<ref name="FloraBase" /

Ecology
An assessment of the potential impact of climate change on this species found that it was likely to be driven to extinction by loss of habitat by 2080, even under mild climate change scenarios.

Conservation status
This banksia is classified as "Priority Three" by the Government of Western Australia Department of Parks and Wildlife meaning that it is poorly known and known from only a few locations but is not under imminent threat.

References

meganotia
Plants described in 1996
Taxa named by Alex George